Gasser can mean:
 Gasser (manga), a fictional character also known as Heppokomaru
 Gasser (car), a certain style of hot rod
 Hungarian or Montenegrin Gasser pistols, e.g.: Gasser M1870
 Someone who or something that gasses in its various meanings
 e.g. see The Mad Gasser of Mattoon
 Someone with red hair or who has bleached and straightened his hair to an orange reddish tint using gasoline.
 Used in the 1940 novel Native Son by Richard Wright and Durango Street (1976) by Frank Bonham

People
Adolf Gasser (1903–1985), Swiss historian
Elsa Gasser (1896–1967), Polish-born Swiss economist
Herbert Spencer Gasser (1888–1963), American physiologist
Hans Gasser (1817-1868), Austrian painter and sculptor
 (1723–1765), Austrian anatomist
Joseph Gasser von Valhorn (1816–1900), Austrian sculptor, brother of Hans
Josh Gasser (born 1992), American basketball player
Lucien Gasser (1897-1939), French World War I flying ace
Mark Gasser (born 1972), British concert pianist
Nolan Gasser (born 1964), American composer, pianist, musicologist
Sandra Gasser (born 1962), retired Swiss track and field athlete
Susan M. Gasser, Swiss biologist

See also

Surnames of South Tyrolean origin
Surnames of Austrian origin
German toponymic surnames